The 1974–75 Australians beat the touring England team 4–1 in the 1974-75 Ashes series. Labelled the Ugly Australians for their hard-nosed cricket, sledging and hostile fast bowling they are regarded as one of the toughest teams in cricket history. Don Bradman ranked them just after his powerful teams of the late 1940s, and Tom Graveney third amongst post-war cricket teams after the 1948 Australians and 1984 West Indians. The spearhead of the team was the fast-bowling duo of Dennis Lillee, whose hatred of English batsmen was well known, and Jeff Thomson, who outraged old fashioned cricketers by saying he liked to see "blood on the wicket". Wisden reported that "never in the 98 years of Test cricket have batsmen been so grievously bruised and battered by ferocious, hostile, short-pitched balls". "Behind the batsmen, Rod Marsh and his captain Ian Chappell would vie with each other in profanity", but the predatory wicketkeeper and Australian slip cordon snapped up most chances that came their way. Their batting line up was also impressive with the opener Ian Redpath spending over 32 hours at the crease in the series, followed by Rick McCosker, Ian and Greg Chappell, Doug Walters and Ross Edwards. In the last Test of the series Lillee and Thomson were injured, the out of form England captain Mike Denness made 188 and England won by an innings.

The captain

There have been few shrewder captains than Ian Chappell, who knew how to squeeze the last drop out of any situation that might help give his team an advantage. He was an absolute master at putting pressure on the opposition with just the right run rate or with a field that could be almost impossible to pierce ... Some of his tactics were quite intimidatory and stank of out-and-out gamesmanship that made old pros like me wince. It was an open secret that he used to encourage his players to give a lot of verbal abuse to rival batsman when they were at the wicket in an attempt to break their concentration.
Tom Graveney
Ian Chappell came from a South Australian cricket dynasty, his maternal grandfather Vic Richardson had been captain of Australia and his younger brothers Greg and Trevor Chappell also played for Australia. In the 1960s the young Ian Chappell had been noted as an aggressive batsman and gifted slip fielder who played for South Australia when only 18 and Australia when 21. He was not an immediate success with the bat, he made only one century in his first 17 Tests, but kept his place due to some extraordinary slip catches and his ability as a part-time leg-spinner. He ended his run-drought with 548 runs (68.50) against the West Indies in 1968–69. He was known as a man who could make runs when Australia were under pressure, and some thought he was a better batsman than his gifted brother Greg for this reason. Despite a poor tour of South Africa in 1969–70 Chappell was made Bill Lawry's vice-captain in the 1970–71 Ashes series. Lawry's defensive tactics earned him few friends and when Australia went into the last Test needing a victory to retain the Ashes he was controversially replaced by the aggressive Chappell, who had already made two centuries in the series. Chappell won the toss, put England in to bat and Australia had a 100 run lead in the first innings, but Ray Illingworth's team fought back to win the Test and the series. Nevertheless, Chappell was made captain for the 1972 Ashes series and his young team surprised Illingworth's veterans by halving the series 2–2. He now had young talent in the shape of Rod Marsh, Greg Chappell, Dennis Lillee, Bob Massie, Ross Edwards, Max Walker and Jeff Thomson and moulded them into a tough, combative team that dominated the mid-1970s; they beat Pakistan 3–0 and the West Indies 2–0 in 1972–73, New Zealand 2–0 in 1973–74, England 4–1 in 1974–75 and 1–0 in 1975. This success was not without its price as the Ugly Australians won few prizes for sportsmanship, with Chappell demanding 100% commitment from his players, and winning at all costs. In the 1975 Cricket World Cup Australia made 328/5 against Sri Lanka and Chappell told his team to go easy as the newcomers could not possibly win and he wanted to improve their image, but he reversed his decision when they reached 70/1. As a result, Sidath Wettimuny was carried off the field after being hit three times by Jeff Thomson, the 5'2" Duleep Mendis retired hurt after being hit between the eyes by a bouncer and Australia won by 52 runs. In 1975–76 he passed on the Australian captaincy to his brother Greg, but stayed in the team as they beat Clive Lloyd's West Indians 5–1. He was instrumental in the creation of Kerry Packer's professional World Series Cricket to rival the Australian Board of Control and improve the financial lot of Australian cricketers and captained the WSC Australia XI. When Packer and the ABC came to a deal Chappell returned to Test cricket against England the West Indies in 1979–80 before finally retiring.

Batting
In essence the Australian batting revolved around Ian and Greg Chappell and the new stability of Doug Walters. The Chappell combination was probably the strongest fraternal Test-match pair since the era of the Graces. In the First Test against New Zealand in Wellington in March 1974, they struck new coinage in cricket records by both scoring centuries in each innings. Greg's unbeaten 247 stamped him as probably one of the best players in the world; correct, upright and unrelenting. But brother Ian, with pugnacity and shuffling, hooking savagery, was virtually his equal in scoring terms. Walters also proved that he could now be ranked with the greats by scoring a peerless, unbeaten 104 in the levelling Third Test at Auckland, when all climatic and wicket conditions favoured the medium-pace of the Hadlees and Collinge.
Frank Tyson

Australia had a sound batting line up with Ian Redpath replacing Bill Lawry as the country's premier opening batsmen. He spent 32 hours at the crease in the six Tests while compiling 472 runs (42.95) at his own pace. Never a pretty or flashy batsmen he was the backbone of the team and the England fast bowler John Snow wrote "I liked bowling to him least of all...a real nuisance batsman". Greg Chappell said Redpath was one of only two players he knew who would kill to get into the Australian Test team, the other being Rod Marsh. Initially his opening partner was Wally Edwards, but this attacking left-hander failed and was dropped after making a duck in the Third Test. He was replaced by Rick McCosker, a gutsy batsmen best remembered for batting in the Centenary Test despite having his jaw broken by Bob Willis, but who made 80 on his Test debut in the Fourth Test. Greg Chappell had emerged as Australia's best batsman, making 247 not out and 133 against New Zealand the previous season. This was the most runs made by a batsman in a Test until Brian Lara made his record 400 not out thirty years later, his elder brother Ian Chappell made 145 and 121, a unique occurrence of two brothers each making two centuries in the same Test. Greg was an imperious batsman, full of class and his Test average of 53.86 is superior to that of any Australian batsman since Bradman. Doug Walters was a great entertainer who delighted his home crowd, who labelled the famous Sydney Hill "the Doug Walters Stand". His shots were often unorthodox and his 103 in the Second Test at Perth was the first time a hundred runs had been made by a batsman in one session in an Ashes Test for decades, with a six off Bob Willis bringing up the hundred off the last ball of the day. Ross Edwards was a sound batsmen who started life as Rod Marsh's understudy as Western Australia's wicketkeeper. He worked on his batting and made 170 not out in the 1972 Ashes series when used as a makeshift opener. Lower in the order Rod Marsh was hard-hitting left-handed batsmen who first made the Australian team for his batting skills, Max Walker was a big hitter of the ball and he and Terry Jenner verged on all-rounder status.

Bowling
In this past series Lillee and Thomson were probably ... the fastest and most lethal opening pair in Australia's history. They possessed remarkable physique, strength and stamina, and ability and (may I add in the confines of diplomacy) a willingness to exploit the short-pitched ball to an extent that would have unnerved any side.
Don Bradman

Strange as it may seem England had few qualms about the Australian bowling at the start of the series. Dennis Lillee and Bob Massie had been overbowled in 1972 and 1973 and had both broken down with crippling injuries, while Jeff Thomson – if they had heard of him – had taken 0/110 in his only Test. However, Lillee returned to Test cricket after considerable determination to overcome his injuries and though he lost a yard or two of pace he had lost none of his old venom and "bowled with a hostility that bordered on savagery". His new bowling action was a text-book model and his straight arm gave him movement through the air and off the pitch that made him more dangerous than ever. But the real revelation was Thomson, whose javelin throw action gave him enormous pace and "slung the ball down at sizzling pace, getting dangerous lift off a length, and not worrying overmuch where the ball landed" In 1975–76 his bowling was clocked at 99.6 mph compared to Lillee's 86.4 and his very inaccuracy made him dangerous, the batsmen never knew where the ball was going to land next. They were given wholehearted support by Max Walker, as fast-medium bowler whose awkward whirlwind bowling action gave him the nickname of Tangles. 6'4" tall and as strong as a bull Walker was an accurate swing bowler and took 8/143 in the last Test when Lillee and Thomson were injured. Geoff Dymock was a left-arm swing bowler who struggled to keep his pace in a strong Australian team, but became the first Australian to dismiss all 11 opposition batsmen in a Test when he took 12/166 at Kanpur in 1979–80. Doug Walters was a part-time bowler, but his medium-paced "Golden Arm" was capable of breaking any partnership and he deserved to be regarded an all-rounder. Greg Chappell was also seen as an all-rounder in his youth, and continued to bowl throughout his Test career, but mainly to tie up one end while the other bowlers rested. The orthodox off-spinner Ashley Mallett could turn the ball very sharply. Tom Graveney thought he was the finest Australian off-spinner since the war and came second in the averages after Thomson. Historically Australian selectors preferred a leg-spinner, but Terry Jenner failed to hold his place and as fast-bowling rose in prominence the Australian 'leggie' became almost extinct.

Fielding
In one department however the 1974–75 combination excelled any other that I have seen. They were the best fielding combination I have ever witnessed on the cricket field ... everyone chased like demons, caught like angels, and, unfortunately, occasionally swore like troopers. Looking back at the Perth Test , I still find it difficult to believe that some of the catches that were taken were even in the bounds of possibility.
Frank Tyson

Ian Chappell drove his team to excel themselves on the field and the Australian bowlers were backed up by some superb catches. Rod Marsh had thrown off his 'Iron Gloves' tag and was beginning to rival Alan Knott as the best keeper in the world. The Chappell brothers were both excellent slip fielders, taking 227 catches between them in Test cricket, with Greg took 7 catches in the Second Test at Perth – setting a record for a fieldsman – and 14 in the series, another record. Ashley Mallett a specialist in the gully, Ross Edwards a gifted cover fieldsman and Ian Redpath a remarkable close fielder anywhere.

Test statistics

First Test – Brisbane

See Main Article – 1974–75 Ashes series

Second Test – Perth

See Main Article – 1974–75 Ashes series

Third Test – Melbourne

See Main Article – 1974–75 Ashes series

First One Day International – Melbourne

See Main Article – 1974–75 Ashes series

Fourth Test – Sydney

See Main Article – 1974–75 Ashes series

Fifth Test – Adelaide

See Main Article – 1974–75 Ashes series

Sixth Test – Sydney

See Main Article – 1974–75 Ashes series

References

Bibliography
 John Arlott, John Arlott's 100 Greatest Batsman, Macdonald Queen Anne Press, 1986
 Ashley Brown, A Pictorial History of Cricket, Bison Books Ltd, 1988
 Greg Chappell, Old Hands Showed The Way, Test Series Official Book 1986–87, The Clashes for the Ashes, Australia vs England, Playbill Sport Publication, 1986
 Ian Chappell, Austin Robertson and Paul Rigby, Chappelli Has the Last Laugh, Lansdowne Press, 1980
 Tom Graveney and Norman Miller, The Ten Greatest Test Teams, Sidgewick and Jackson, 1988
 E.W. Swanton, Swanton in Australia with MCC 1946–75, Fontant, 1977
 Frank Tyson, Test of Nerves, Test series 1974–75 Australia versus England, Manark Pty Ltd, 1975
 Bob Willis and Patrick Murphy, Starting With Grace, A Pictorial Celebration of Cricket 1864–1986, Stanley Paul, 1986

Annual reviews
 Playfair Cricket Annual 1971
 Wisden Cricketers' Almanack 1971

Further reading
 Mark Browning, Rod Marsh: A Life in Cricket, Rosenberg Publishing, 2003
 Ian Brayshaw, The Chappell Era, ABC Enterprises, 1984
 Ian Chappell and Ashley Mallett, Hitting Out: The Ian Chappell Story, Orion, 2006
 Bill Frindall, The Wisden Book of Test Cricket 1877–1978, Wisden, 1979
 Colin Firth, Pageant of Cricket, The MacMillan Company of Australia,1987
 Chris Harte, A History of Australian Cricket, Andre Deutsch, 1993
 Ken Kelly and David Lemmon, Cricket Reflections: Five Decades of Cricket Photographs, Heinemann, 1985
 Dennis Lillee, Lillee, My Life in Cricket, Methuen Australia, 1982
 Dennis Lillee, Menace: the Autobiography, Headline Book Publishing, 2003
 Ashley Mallett, Rowdy, Lynton Publications, 1973
 Ashley Mallett, Spin Out, Garry Sparke & Associates, 1977
 Ashley Mallett, One of a Kind: The Doug Walters Story, Orion, 2009
 Rod Marsh, The Gloves of Irony, Pan, 1999
 Adrian McGregor, Greg Chappell, Collins, 1985
 Ray Robinson, On Top Down Under, Cassell, 1975
 E.W. Swanton (ed), The Barclays World of Cricket, Collins, 1986

Video
 Allan Border and David Gower, The Best of the Ashes – 1970 – 1987, 2 Entertain Video, 1991

External links
 CricketArchive tour itinerary

1974 in Australian cricket
1975 in Australian cricket
1974–75 Australian cricket season